The 4-millimeter band is a portion of the EHF (microwave) radio spectrum internationally allocated to amateur radio and amateur satellite use.  The band is between 75.5 GHz and 81.5 GHz, with some regional and national variations.

Due to the lack of commercial off the shelf radios, amateurs who operate on the 4 mm band must design and construct their own equipment.  Amateurs often use the band to experiment with the maximum communication distance they can achieve, and they also use it occasionally for radio contesting.

Amateur radio shares the band with radio astronomy, vehicular radars for adaptive cruise control, and aircraft FOD detection radars.

Allocation 
The International Telecommunication Union allocates 76.0 GHz to 81.0 GHz to amateur radio, amateur satellites, radio astronomy and radiolocation (radar) and space research downlinks.  Amateurs operate on a primary basis between 77.5 GHz and 78.0 GHz and on a secondary basis in the rest of the band.  Also, 81.0 GHz to 81.5 GHz is allocated by ITU footnote 5.561A to the amateur and amateur-satellite services on a secondary basis.  The ITU's allocations are the same in all three ITU regions.

Until 2006, 75.5 GHz to 76.0 GHz was also allocated by the ITU to amateurs on a primary basis.  In response to this change, CEPT added footnote EU35 to the "European Common Allocation Table", which provides a continued allocation of this segment to European amateurs.

List of notable frequencies 
75,976.200 MHz Preferred narrow band calling frequency in CEPT countries
76,032.200 MHz Narrow band calling frequency in some countries
77,500.200 MHz Preferred narrow band calling frequency, outside the CEPT area

Distance records 
The current world distance record on the 4 mm band was  set by US stations AD6IW and KF6KVG / K6GZA on June 14, 2014.

In Australia, the 4 mm distance record was  set by stations VK4FB and VK4CSD on July 18, 2019.

See also 
Amateur radio frequency allocations
W band

References

External links 
 UK Microwave Group's 75 GHz page
 First 75 GHz VUCC - Mount Greylock Expeditionary Force
 Building a 76 GHz transverter

Amateur radio bands